United Nations documents related to decolonization of Spanish Sahara, the Western Sahara conflict, Moroccan military occupation, Sahrawi refugees, and the establishment of MINURSO.

Security Council Resolutions

General Assembly Resolution

See also
Political status of Western Sahara
United Nations General Assembly Resolution
United Nations Security Council Resolution

External links
Western Sahara documents from the UN

 
United Nations resolutions concerning Morocco
United Nations
Western Sahara
Western Sahara peace process